The Coleman Mine is an underground nickel and copper mine operated by Vale  northwest of Sudbury, Ontario, Canada. It is the flagship mine of Vale's Sudbury operation. The mine recently implemented the use of electric haul vehicles and installed an underground 4G LTE network.

The mine is operated by a staff of 545 workers.

Ore had been transported by rail or by truck for processing at Clarabelle Mill. Vale shut down processing at the mill in 2017 due to reduced output at adjacent mining operations.

See also
List of nickel mines in Canada
List of copper mines in Canada
Highland Valley Copper mine
Mount Polley mine
Kidd Mine
New Afton mine

References

Mines in Greater Sudbury
Nickel mines in Canada
Copper mines in Ontario
Underground mines in Canada
Mines in Ontario
Vale S.A.